Clemence Massif is an elongated, mostly ice-free massif,  long and rising to , standing  southeast of Shaw Massif on the east side of Lambert Glacier. It was discovered by Australian National Antarctic Research Expeditions personnel from Beaver aircraft piloted by Flying Officer D.M. Johnston, Royal Australian Air Force (RAAF), in 1957, and named by the Antarctic Names Committee of Australia for Squadron Leader P.H. Clemence, who commanded the RAAF Antarctic Flight at Mawson Station in 1957.

References 

Mountains of Mac. Robertson Land